Peter Gammons (born April 9, 1945) is an American sportswriter, media personality, and musician. He is a recipient of the J. G. Taylor Spink Award for outstanding baseball writing, given by the Baseball Writers' Association of America.

Early life
Gammons was born in Boston and raised in Groton, Massachusetts, where he graduated from Groton School. After graduating from Groton in 1965, he attended the University of North Carolina at Chapel Hill where he was a member of St. Anthony Hall. He worked for the university's student-run newspaper, The Daily Tar Heel, and the student-run radio station, WXYC.

Career

Print 
After graduating in 1969, he began his journalism career at The Boston Globe. Gammons was a featured writer at The Boston Globe for many years as the main journalist covering the Boston Red Sox. (1969–1975, 1978–1986), or as a national baseball columnist. For many years he was a colleague of other legendary Globe sports writers Will McDonough, Bob Ryan and Leigh Montville. Between his two stints as a baseball columnist with the Globe, he was lead baseball columnist  for Sports Illustrated (1976–78, 1986–90), where he covered baseball, hockey, and college basketball. Gammons also wrote a column for The Sporting News in the 1980s.

Gammons has also authored numerous baseball books, including Beyond the Sixth Game and was a well known supporter of now disgraced Steroid-Era pitcher Roger Clemens.

TV work 
In 1988, he joined ESPN, where he served primarily as an in-studio analyst.  During the baseball season, he appeared nightly on Baseball Tonight and had regular spots on SportsCenter, ESPNEWS and ESPN Radio. He wrote an Insider column for ESPN.com and also wrote for ESPN The Magazine. The Globe reprinted some of his ESPN columns well into the 1990s. In 2006, Gammons was named as one of two field-level reporters for ESPN's Sunday Night Baseball, joining Bonnie Bernstein. He held that position through the 2008 season, when he moved exclusively to baseball.

After being out for illness, Gammons returned to ESPN on Wednesday, September 20, 2006. He reported from Fenway Park on the 6 P.M. edition of SportsCenter and the 7 P.M. edition of Baseball Tonight. Gammons resumed his regular reporting coverage during the 2007 baseball season.

After 20 years with ESPN, on December 8, 2009, Gammons announced that he would leave ESPN to pursue "new challenges" and a "less demanding schedule". Gammons joined the MLB Network and MLB.com as on-air and online analyst. He also works for NESN.

Other activities 
Gammons is on the 10-person voting panel for the Fielding Bible Awards, an alternative to the Gold Glove Awards in Major League Baseball.

Honors 

 He was voted the National Sportswriter of the Year in 1989, 1990 and 1993 by the National Sportscasters and Sportswriters Association. 
 He has also been awarded an honorary Poynter Fellow from Yale University.
 Peter Gammons was the 2004 recipient of the J. G. Taylor Spink Award for outstanding baseball writing given by the BBWAA.
 January 9, 2009 was proclaimed Peter Gammons day in the City of Boston. The proclamation was made by Michael Ross, president of the Boston City Council at the Hot Stove Cool Music Sports Roundtable at Fenway Park. 2010 marked the 10th anniversary of Hot Stove Cool Music, a charitable concert benefiting the Foundation To Be Named Later. At this event, Theo Epstein, Vice President and General Manager of the Boston Red Sox, announced a new scholarship in Gammons' name. The "Peter Gammons - Foundation To Be Named Later Scholarship presented by RISO" enables select Boston Public Schools students to attend college who otherwise might not have the chance.
 In 2018, Gammons was inducted into the Cape Cod Baseball League Hall of Fame in recognition of his longtime support of the league.
 The Boston Baseball Band wrote a song about Gammons called "Jammin' With Peter Gammons."

Music 

Gammons has a penchant for indie rock and the blues, and is active in the Boston indie rock scene when his other commitments allow him time; he has been sighted at several Midnight Oil shows and has mentioned the band in several columns. He is also a fan of Pearl Jam and has talked about experiences at concerts as well as previous albums (as heard on various ESPN Radio shows). With the assistance of a band of Boston musicians and former Boston Red Sox General Manager Theo Epstein, Gammons plays a Fender Stratocaster and sings at the annual Hot Stove, Cool Music concert event to benefit Theo and Paul Epstein's Foundation To Be Named Later, a charity that raises funds and awareness for non-profit agencies serving disadvantaged youth in the Greater Boston area.

Gammons' debut album, Never Slow Down, Never Grow Old, was released on July 4, 2006.  Gammons sang and played guitar on this collection of originals and covers that includes The Clash's Death or Glory and Warren Zevon's Model Citizen. Proceeds again went to Epstein's charity.

Gammons founded the Hot Stove Cool Music benefit concert series with sportswriter Jeff Horrigan, Casey Riddles, Debbi Wrobleski, Mindy d'Arbeloff and singer Kay Hanley in December 2000. The fundraiser now takes place twice each year with one show in January and another in July or August.

Gammons is tightly connected to the Boston rock scene. He even served as minister at the November 2007 marriage of bassist Ed Valauskas (Gravel Pit, the Gentlemen) and singer Jennifer D'Angora (Downbeat 5, the Dents, Jenny Dee and the Deelinquents).

Personal life
He lives in Boston, Massachusetts and Cape Cod, Massachusetts with his wife Gloria.

On June 27, 2006, Gammons was stricken with the rupture of a brain aneurysm in the morning near his home on Cape Cod, Massachusetts. He was initially rushed to Falmouth Hospital before being airlifted to Brigham and Women's Hospital in Boston. At Brigham and Women's Hospital, Gammons' operation was performed by neurosurgeon Dr. Arthur Day who was a friend to late Red Sox hitter Ted Williams.  Sportswriter Bob Ryan of The Boston Globe reported that Gammons was expected to be in intensive care for 10 to 12 days.  He was resting in intensive care following the operation, and doctors listed him in "good" condition the following day.

On July 17, he was released from the hospital and entered the Rehabilitation Hospital of the Cape and Islands.

On August 19, Gammons made his first public appearance since the aneurysm rupture at Fenway Park when the Red Sox played the Yankees.

References

External links
 Blog at ESPN.com
 Peter Gammons: MLB Network Insider at MLB On-Air Personalities
 Baseball Hall of Fame - Spink Award recipient
 Never Slow Down, Never Grow Old
 Foundation To Be Named Later
 Gammons visits Fenway Park 
 

1945 births
Baseball writers
American newspaper reporters and correspondents
American television reporters and correspondents
BBWAA Career Excellence Award recipients
The Boston Globe people
Boston Red Sox announcers
Living people
Major League Baseball broadcasters
MLB Network personalities
Writers from Boston
Cape Cod Baseball League
University of North Carolina at Chapel Hill alumni
People from Bourne, Massachusetts
People from Groton, Massachusetts
Sportspeople from Barnstable County, Massachusetts
Sportspeople from Middlesex County, Massachusetts
Sportswriters from Massachusetts
St. Anthony Hall